Daniel Peacock (born 2 October 1958) is an English actor, director, writer and carer. He has worked with the team of The Comic Strip Presents... and played "Mental Mickey" in Only Fools and Horses.

Early and personal life
Peacock was born on 2 October 1958 in Hammersmith, London. He is the son of late actor and composer Trevor Peacock (who played Jim Trott in The Vicar of Dibley) and Iris Jones and the half-brother of actor Harry Peacock (a regular Star Stories satirist). He attended Ashmole School in Southgate, London.

Career
He attended the Central School of Speech & Drama before leaving early to pursue a career as a comedian in an act called the 'Diamond Brothers'.  He worked as a bluecoat for a Pontins Holiday camp in Selsey, West Sussex in 1978.

Daniel has also had success as a television series writer credited with Teenage Health Freak (C4), Sister Said, Cavegirl (BBC) and other successful series.

He moved into acting and writing and his credits as an actor include the following television series: Assaulted Nuts, The Young Ones, Little Armadillos, Only Fools and Horses, Robin of Sherwood, The Bill, Doctor Who as Nord the Vandal in the serial The Greatest Show in the Galaxy, Casualty and One Foot in the Grave.

Peacock has also starred in the second series of Coming of Age as DK's estranged father who has just left prison.

His film appearances include Bloody Kids, The Supergrass, Riding High, Porridge, Quadrophenia, Gandhi, I Bought a Vampire Motorcycle, Party Party, Whoops Apocalypse, Bull in Robin Hood: Prince of Thieves, and Carry On Columbus. He also played young Jacques Clouseau in Trail of the Pink Panther and he appeared in The Jewel of the Nile as the special effects maestro.

He was one of the regular cast in Nick Hyde and Glen Cardno's Valentine Park for ATV Network starring Ken Jones, David Thewlis and Liz Smith and wrote Men of the World starring John Simm and David Threlfall, Cavegirl, Harry and Cosh, Mud, Very Big Very Soon for Central TV starring Paul Shane, Sheila White, Shaun Curry and Tim Wylton, as well as adapting Teenage Health Freak for TV. He voiced a Beeposaurus in "The Beeps".

He appeared in a series of musical adverts in the 1980s for the Do It All chain of DIY stores along with another Comic Strip actor, Ron Tarr, and the Birds Eye Steakhouse advertisement featuring the song "We Hope It's Chips", sung to the tune of "Que Sera Sera".

Daniel also stars as a thug in "Billy's Christmas Angels" which was shown on Channel 4 in 1988 alongside Nabil Shaban who was Sil the Slug in Doctor Who and Steve Johnson from Terror Towers and Motormouth.

His credits as a director include the metaseries Harry and Cosh, Morris 2274, Billie: Girl from the Future and Cavegirl.

For a short time he was the lead singer in a 5 piece band called The wild men of Wonga, releasing a single in 1985 . They played at least one gig at the now defunct Rock Garden in Covent Garden in the early - mid 1980's.

His latest sitcom, Marley's Ghosts, revolves around a woman called Marley Wise who finds she can communicate with the dead. The series first aired on Gold in September 2015.

Since around 2019, Peacock has been working as a carer at Hastings Court Care Home in East Sussex, resulting in a nomination for a National Care Award in 2022.

References

External links
 

1958 births
Living people
20th-century English male actors
21st-century English male actors
British male television writers
English male film actors
English male television actors
English television directors
English television writers
Male actors from London
Peacock family
People from Hammersmith
The Comic Strip